The narrow-lined tree frog (Isthmohyla angustilineata) is a species of frogs in the family Hylidae found in the mountains of Costa Rica and western Panama. Its natural habitats are humid lower montane rainforests. It is a nocturnal species that breeds in small puddles and water-filled depressions.

Population declines of this species have been attributed to chytridiomycosis. It is found in several protected areas.

References

Isthmohyla
Amphibians of Costa Rica
Amphibians of Panama
Amphibians described in 1952
Taxonomy articles created by Polbot